Mamadou Faye (born 31 December 1967) is a Senegalese former professional footballer who played as a midfielder. He played in seven matches for the Senegal national team from 1994 to 1999. He was also named in Senegal's squad for the 1994 African Cup of Nations tournament.

References

External links
 

1967 births
Living people
Footballers from Dakar
Senegalese footballers
Association football midfielders
Senegal international footballers
1994 African Cup of Nations players
Ligue 1 players
Ligue 2 players
ES La Ciotat players
SC Bastia players
Gazélec Ajaccio players
Senegalese expatriate footballers
Senegalese expatriate sportspeople in France
Expatriate footballers in France